Invest KOREA (IK), Korea's national investment promotion agency, was established as part of the Korea Trade-Investment Promotion Agency (KOTRA) to promote foreign direct investment(FDI) to Korea. It provides comprehensive services for all investment stages of Korea, including investment feasibility study, investment execution(establishment of foreign invested company, investment declaration, legal consultation, etc.), and grievance resolution.

Since 2018, it has been supporting all FDI-related matters in Korea through adding supporting outbound FDI of domestic companies and to Korean companies' reshoring to Korea on its function.

History 
In August 1995, a function to promote FDI(Foreign Direct Investment) to Korea was added to KOTRA following the revision of the related law, and the name of KOTRA was changed from Korea Trade Promotion Agency to Korea Trade-Investment Promotion Agency. 

In July 1998, Invest KOREA's predecessor, the Korea Investment Service Center (KISC) was established in the wake of the 1997 Asian financial crisis as part of the liberalization of the Korean investment regime.

In October 1999, the Foreign Investment Ombudsman Office in KOTRA was established to strengthen the function of foreign invested companies' grievance resolution.

In December 2003, the Foreign Investment Center was re-launched as Invest KOREA.

In May 2018, the function of supporting overseas investment (Outbound FDI) of Korean companies was added to Invest KOREA.

In February 2019, the function of supporting the reshoring of Korean companies operating overseas was added to Invest KOREA.

Functions 
Invest KOREA provides comprehensive services for all investment stages of Korea, including investment feasibility study, investment execution(establishment of foreign invested company, investment declaration, legal consultation, etc.), and grievance resolution.

Pre-Investment Stage 
 Preliminary information study: Search and provide information required for investment feasibility study
 Find potential investors and arrange consultations
 Consultations on specific sectors: Incentives, legal affairs, accounting, taxation industrial sites, etc.

Investment Execution Stage 
 Investment notification: Receive notification of foreign investment (issuance of certificate of foreign investment)
 Arrival of investment: Issuance of registration certificate of foreign-invested company
 Search for factory site: Look for optimal factory site for investors and provide relevant administrative services
 Corporate establishment: Support for corporate registration and licensing and approvals
 Visa issuance: D-8, F-3, etc.

Post-Investment Stage 
 Foreign Investment Ombudsman: "Home doctors" resolve the grievances of foreign-invested companies
 Visa extension: Handle works related to alien registration and extension of stay
 Support life in Korea: Search for houses, foreign schools and surrounding living facilities to help employees of foreign-invested companies and their families get settled in Korea
Other than the inbound FDI promotion to Korea, Invest KOREA support outbound FDI of Korean companies and reshoring of Korean companies operating overseas through cooperation with overseas offices of KOTRA.

Commissioners 

 (1st) Alan Timblick : 2003.12.5. ~ 2005.12.4.
 (2nd) Tong-Soo Chung  : 2006.2.16. ~ 2010.3.15.
 (3rd) Hongchul Ahn : 2010.3.16. ~ 2012.3.15.
 (4th) Ki Won Han : 2012.4.1. ~ 2015.12.31.
 (5th) Yong-kook Kim : 2016.2.11. ~ 2018.8.31.
 (6th) Shawn Chang : 2018.9.1. ~ 2023.1.18.
 (Present) Tae Hyung Kim : 2023.1.19. ~

Structure  

Based within the KOTRA headquarters in Seoul, the commissioner of Invest KOREA is supported by staff members who are KOTRA employees, recruited specialists in investment-related fields, and civil servants dispatched from other agencies and ministries, including the Ministry of Trade, Industry and Energy under whose umbrella Invest KOREA falls. Invest KOREA works in collaboration with its network of 36 overseas branch offices of KOTRA, which are located in financial and industrial hubs around the world. Invest KOREA implements government policies on foreign investment that have been formulated by the Ministry of Trade, Industry and Energy and coordinated by the Foreign Investment Committee.

Invest KOREA consist of three main departments: the Investment Planning Department, Investment Promotion Department, and Overseas Investment & Reshoring Support Department.

Investment Consulting Center (ICC) 
The Investment Consulting Center (ICC) provides tailored consulting services free of charge to foreigners who wish to invest in Korea. The services include pre-investment market research, administrative support, and settlement assistance for establishing businesses in Korea. The center is staffed by consultants; who are private-sector experts including accountants, lawyers and labor lawyers and civil servants with experiences in sectors including visa, tax, customs and environment.

At the ICC, investors can receive one-on-one consultations on taxation, accounting, and law in the beginning of an investment, and receive administrative assistance directly from government officials for visa application, certification of investment completion and business registration. The center also provides personalized life settlement consultations and one-day, on-site assistance to help investors settle successfully in Korea.

Free consultations are available both for foreign investors and their family members via phone, fax, online, video conference or walk-in during our office hours.

Invest KOREA Plaza (IKP) 
Invest KOREA Plaza (IKP) is Korea’s first business incubation center and investment support facility for foreign investors. IKP is located in Seoul, the business hub of Northeast Asia. About 40 foreign-invested companies rent offices at IKP every year to receive one-stop service ranging from administrative support to business consultations. The experts at IKP specialize in a variety of sectors including law, accounting, tax, customs, visa, labor and industrial sites and offer services related to foreign investment consultations, investment notification and grievance resolution.

The Plaza also provides offices, business lounges, video conference rooms, shower stalls and sleeping lounge for foreign investors.

Office of the Foreign Investment Ombudsman 
The Office of the Foreign Investment Ombudsman (OFIO), which was established in 1999, aims to resolve the grievances of foreign-invested companies operating in Korea.

The Foreign Investment Ombudsman is commissioned by the President of the Republic of Korea and the OFIO operates a "Home Doctor" system under which specialists from various fields, such as finance, accounting, law, industrial sites, taxation, law etc., provide foreign-invested companies one-on-one service by investigating and resolving a wide range of grievances in the most efficient and effective manner.

The United Nations Conference on Trade and Development and Asia-Pacific Economic Cooperation have acknowledged Korea’s Foreign Investment Ombudsman system as an effective way to prevent investor-state disputes. The OFIO works to prevent problems and improve Korea’s investment environment.

Invest Korea magazine 

Invest Korea, formerly known as the KOTRA Express, has been published by KOTRA since 1983.  Initially known as the Invest Korea Journal, the periodical, with a subscription-only readership of 8,200, presents perspectives on Korea's investment, economy, industry, trade and culture.

See also
Investment promotion agency
KOTRA

References

External links 

 

Investment promotion agencies
Government agencies of South Korea